Geneva is an unincorporated area and census-designated place (CDP) in Whatcom County, Washington, United States. The population was 2,321 at the 2010 census.

Based on per capita income, Geneva ranks 85th of 522 areas in the state of Washington to be ranked. It is also the highest rank achieved in Whatcom County.

Geography
Geneva is located at  (48.746730, -122.405775).

According to the United States Census Bureau, the CDP has a total area of 1.3 square miles (3.3 km2), of which, 1.0 square miles (2.7 km2) of it is land and 0.2 square miles (0.6 km2) of it (18.75%) is water.

Demographics
As of the census of 2000, there were 2,257 people, 778 households, and 655 families residing in the CDP. The population density was 2,166.6 people per square mile (837.9/km2). There were 809 housing units at an average density of 776.6/sq mi (300.3/km2). The racial makeup of the CDP was 95.92% White, 0.22% African American, 0.84% Native American, 0.75% Asian, 0.04% Pacific Islander, 0.97% from other races, and 1.24% from two or more races. Hispanic or Latino of any race were 2.53% of the population.

There were 778 households, out of which 43.6% had children under the age of 18 living with them, 73.9% were married couples living together, 6.7% had a female householder with no husband present, and 15.8% were non-families. 11.7% of all households were made up of individuals, and 3.2% had someone living alone who was 65 years of age or older. The average household size was 2.90 and the average family size was 3.11.

In the CDP, the age distribution of the population shows 29.5% under the age of 18, 6.6% from 18 to 24, 27.5% from 25 to 44, 27.9% from 45 to 64, and 8.6% who were 65 years of age or older. The median age was 38 years. For every 100 females, there were 100.4 males. For every 100 females age 18 and over, there were 96.3 males.

The median income for a household in the CDP was $65,324, and the median income for a family was $71,389. Males had a median income of $48,103 versus $40,089 for females. The per capita income for the CDP was $25,374. None of the families and 2.0% of the population were living below the poverty line, including no under eighteens and none of those over 64.

References

Census-designated places in Washington (state)
Census-designated places in Whatcom County, Washington